Bruno Miranda Villagomez (born 10 February 1998) is a Bolivian footballer who plays as a striker for Royal Pari.

Club career
Miranda was born in Santa Cruz de la Sierra, Bolivia. As a teenager, he played his club football in Chile with the Universidad de Chile team. 

Miranda was loaned to D.C. United in August 2017. He made his first MLS appearance on August 13, 2017, being subbed on in a game against Real Salt Lake. His contract option was not exercised by D.C. United after the 2018 season.

Soon after his loan deal with D.C. ended, he joined Wilstermann.

On January 1, 2020, Miranda joined Royal Pari.

International career
Miranda has represented Bolivia internationally at several youth levels: under-15, under-17, and under 20. He made his first appearance for the Bolivia senior men's team in 2016.

International goals
Scores and results list Bolivia's goal tally first.

References

External links

1998 births
Living people
Sportspeople from Santa Cruz de la Sierra
Association football forwards
Bolivian footballers
Bolivia international footballers
Bolivian expatriate footballers
Universidad de Chile footballers
D.C. United players
Richmond Kickers players
C.D. Jorge Wilstermann players
Chilean Primera División players
Major League Soccer players
USL Championship players
Bolivian Primera División players
Bolivian expatriate sportspeople in Chile
Bolivian expatriate sportspeople in the United States
Expatriate footballers in Chile
Expatriate soccer players in the United States
Bolivia youth international footballers
Royal Pari F.C. players